Derbyshire County Cricket Club in 1878 was the cricket season when the English club Derbyshire played their eighth season.

Nottinghamshire played Derbyshire again after a two-year break, joining Yorkshire Hampshire, Lancashire and Kent as the fifth county to play Derbyshire

1878 season 

In 1878, Derbyshire played two county games each against Nottinghamshire, Yorkshire, Lancashire, Kent and one match each against MCC and All England XI. Derbyshire won three first class matches altogether and lost eight. They also played a miscellaneous match against Uppingham.

The captain for the year was Robert Smith. Of the players who made their debuts, John Richardson, a bricklayer, played intermittently over the next five years and Enoch Cook, lace maker, played eight matches over two seasons. Henry Evans, a railway clerk, appeared occasionally over the next five years. John Cartledge and Thomas Limb, a miner, played their only single career first class matches during the season. Conrad Wallroth an Oxford graduate of independent means, and William Wood-Sims, a slater, appeared for the Uppingham match, although they did not make their first-class debuts until the following season. Three players who took part in Derbyshire's first match played their last season for Derbyshire. These were Samuel Richardson, the club's first captain, William Hickton and John Smith. W G Curgenven, who was one of the founders of the club, and played his first game in 1872, also played his last match.

In the opening County match against Yorkshire, Derbyshire scored 109 and Yorkshire replied with 122. Derbyshire scored 34 in the second innings with no player reaching double figures. Yorkshire lost five wickets for 22, but that was enough to give them a five wicket victory. Against MCC Derbyshire made 36 in the first innings, losing eight wickets by WG Grace. MCC made 74 in reply. Derbyshire made 118 in their second innings with 50 from Platts and MCC made the necessary 81 runs in reply with the loss of five wickets. Against Hampshire, Derbyshire made 137, and Hampshire had made 40 at the end of the first day. Hampshire had reached 74 for seven by the end of the second day, and with no play on the final day, the game ended in a draw. In the match against Lancashire, Lancashire opened with 85, Derbyshire replied with 61 and Lancashire had reached 21 in their second innings at the end of day one. Lancashire made 125 in their second innings, and Derbyshire were all out for 76 before the second day was out, leaving a Lancashire victory of 73 runs. In the first match against Kent, Kent made 111 and Derbyshire made 95 in reply. Kent's second innings was dominated by a century from Lord Harris making a total of 228 and Derbyshire managed 162 in reply to give Kent victory by 82 runs. Against Nottinghamshire, Nottinghamshire made 94, Derbyshire made 55, and Nottinghamshire were on 41 in the second innings by the end of the first day. Nottinghamshire reached 176, and Derbyshire were all out for 93 before the end of the second day to give Nottinghamshire a 122 run victory. In the second match against Lancashire, Lancashire made 112 and Derbyshire were on 165 at the end of the first day. Derbyshire reached 250 in their first innings, and Lancashire were all out for 105 on the second day to give Derbyshire a victory by an innings and 33 runs. In the match against the All England Eleven, All England made a first innings total of 190 and Derbyshire reached 90 in reply at the end of the first day. Derbyshire were then all out for 110 and followed on to make 113. All England had made 35 for three before the second day was out and won by seven wickets. The next match was a fixture against Uppingham (probably the school) when Uppingham played with 18 men. Derbyshire replied with 66 to Uppingham's opening 113. Uppingham made 112 in the second innings and Derbyshire replying with 110 were down by 49 runs. In the second match against Kent, Kent opened with 155, Derbyshire replied with 79 and Kent were on 70 for the loss of no wickets by the end of the first day. Kent reached 175 and Derbyshire were all out for 126 before the day was out, to give Kent a 125 run victory. In the second match against Hampshire, Hampshire made 62 and Derbyshire had reached 229 by the end of the first day. Derbyshire finished the first innings on 238 and had Kent all out for 113 on the second day to take a victory by an innings and 63 runs. In the second match against Yorkshire, Derbyshire opened with 106 and left Yorkshire on 78 for 7 by the end of the first day. There was no play on the second day, but on the third day, Derbyshire finished Yorkshire for 84, made 57 in their second innings and had Yorkshire all out for 72 to win by 7 runs. In the last match of the season against Nottinghamshire, Derbyshire made 108 in their first innings and Nottinghamshire replied with 166. Derbyshire made 120 in their second innings and Nottinghamshire made the necessary 65 for the loss of three wickets to win by seven wickets.

Robert Smith was also top scorer and W Mycroft took over 100 wickets for Derbyshire

Matches

Statistics

Cricketers who played and their first-class batting performances 

Smith played 1 match for North v South (36) Rigley played twice for Players v Australians (28) (27)  W Mycroft played 10 innings in 6 other first class matches for a variety of sides scoring 19 runs.

First-class bowling averages 

Mycroft took an additional 15 first class wickets for other teams

Wicket Keeping 
Alfort Smith Catches 12, Stumping 2
Thomas Mycroft Catches 4, Stumping 1

See also 
Derbyshire County Cricket Club seasons
1878 English cricket season

References 

1878 in English cricket
Derbyshire County Cricket Club seasons
English cricket seasons in the 19th century